Indoxacarb is an oxadiazine pesticide developed by DuPont that acts against lepidopteran larvae. It is marketed under the names Indoxacarb Technical Insecticide, Steward Insecticide and Avaunt Insecticide.  It is also used as the active ingredient in the Syngenta line of commercial pesticides: Advion and Arilon.

Its main mode of action is via blocking of neuronal sodium channels.  It is fairly lipophilic with a Kow of 4.65. This pesticide should be used with caution since some insects such as the oriental tobacco budworm (Helicoverpa assulta) become resistant when exposed.

In 2021, the European Union chose not to renew Indoxacarb for use as an insecticide. The United Kingdom still allows use of the compound until 2025.

Development
Indoxacarb was developed by the McCann et al team at E. I. du Pont de Nemours.

Household products

Indoxacarb is the active ingredient in a number of household insecticides, including cockroach and ant baits, and can remain active after digestion.
In 2012 DuPont's Professional Products including the line of Advion and Arilon products was purchased by Syngenta.
Indoxacarb is the active ingredient in the new pet product, Activyl from Merck Animal Health. It is marketed to kill fleas on dogs and cats.

Toxicity to humans 
While toxicity to humans has not been formally studied, there has been a report of a person trying to consume indoxacarb in a suicide attempt. The patient developed methemoglobinemia following ingestion. Methemoglobinemia is a condition which ultimately decreases the effectiveness of red blood cells to exchange oxygen with organs. Methemoglobinemia can be fatal if left untreated, but proper treatment of this condition can rapidly begin reversing it.

References

Further reading

  Moncada, Adriana. Environmental Fate of Indoxacarb.  Environmental Monitoring Branch, Department of Pesticide Regulation, State of California. March 6, 2003

External links
DuPont Steward insecticide - FAQs. Updated 20 January 2007. Retrieved 2012-11-11

Pesticides
Ureas
Methyl esters
Trifluoromethyl ethers
Carboxylate esters
Carbamates
Nitrogen heterocycles
Oxygen heterocycles